The following is a list of symbols of the U.S. state of Connecticut. Symbols are found in Chapter 33, Sections 3.105–110 of the General Statutes of Connecticut, and are listed in the Connecticut State Register and Manual.

Insignia

Flora

Fauna

Geology

Culture

Notes

See also
List of Connecticut-related topics
Lists of United States state insignia
State of Connecticut

References

External links

State symbols
Connecticut